Dumara is a village in Western Province, Papua New Guinea.

Notes

Populated places in the Western Province (Papua New Guinea)